is a Rinzai Zen  temple of the Kenchō-ji branch, located in , Kamo District, Shizuoka Prefecture, Japan.

The sangō is Manpou-zan. The  of Kiiti-ji includes a portraits, a writing and two analects of Yishan Yining in the document archive.
Kiiti-ji is designated as the temple 80 of the Izu 88 temple pilgrimage, and the temple 2 of Izu-yokomichi 33 temple pilgrimage.

Kiiti-ji was often used as a shooting place for television dramas and movies, like “Miyamoto Musashi” and “Crying Out Love in the Center of the World (It’s also known as Socrates in Love).”

History
In the late Kamakura period, Yishan Yining, a Buddhist from the Great Yuan, founded a temple firstly called  , then the temple was renamed Kiiti-ji. In the Muromachi period, the Later   granted the land of 73 goku to Kiiti-ji.
In the early Edo period (Shouhō, 1645-1648), Tokugawa shogunate recognized and assessed Kiiti-ji as the starting point of the teaching of Yishan Yining and valued for its role as a headquarter of 50 temples, Tokugawa Iemitsu granted Kiiti-ji to maintain its original territories. In 1648, Kiiti-ji was granted the land of 20 koku in Funada village and the shuin. After the Tokugawa shogunate fell in 1868, Kiiti-ji returned its territories and the shuin to the new government, but those were bought back a few years later.
It is said that Hakuin Ekaku, one of the most influential figures in Japanese Zen Buddhism and so-called “the ancestor who rejuvenated the Rinzai school of Zen Buddhism in Japan,” once stayed at the temple.

Buildings
According to the Keizoudokuzui, which is a book written by Hakuin Ekaku, the building sheathing Kiiti-ji’s  was requested by Ōishi-Shichirō-Zaemon, then Ōsawa-Yoda clan took over his wish and completed the construction in 1717. Also, the book said that the statue of Goddess Benzaiten being enshrined in the building was made by Prince Shōtoku.

References

Sources

External links 
 
 kiiti-ji Facebook Page

1301 establishments in Asia
Kenchō-ji temples
Rinzai temples
1300s establishments in Japan
Buddhist temples in Shizuoka Prefecture
14th-century Buddhist temples